Nathaniel Revetria Soñora (born June 29, 1981, in Tampico, Mexico), is a retired Mexican-Uruguayan footballer. He is currently the head coach of Centro Atlético Fénix.

Career
Nathaniel started his career in Defensor Sporting, a team based in Montevideo, Uruguay. Since 2001 until 2002 he took part in Uruguay First Division playing for the before-mentioned team. He also played for Juventud until 2003 and then returned to Mexico to play for San Luis F.C. in Liga MX México Primera División during 2004.

During 2006, Nathaniel played for Cultural Leonesa and participated in the Spanish Segunda División B (the third level of football in Spain).

Personal
Revetria's father, Hebert, is a former Uruguay international footballer.

References

External links

1981 births
Living people
Sportspeople from Tampico, Tamaulipas
Cultural Leonesa footballers
Mexican expatriate footballers
Mexican footballers
Mexican emigrants to Uruguay
Uruguayan footballers
Defensor Sporting players
Club Atlético River Plate (Montevideo) players
San Luis F.C. players
Expatriate footballers in Mexico
Expatriate footballers in Uruguay
Footballers from Tamaulipas
Association football forwards
Centro Atlético Fénix managers
C.A. Cerro managers